Gregory Thompson (born 2 January 1971) is a South African cricketer. He played in eleven first-class and five List A matches for Border from 1989/90 to 1994/95.

See also
 List of Border representative cricketers

References

External links
 

1971 births
Living people
South African cricketers
Border cricketers
Cricketers from Bloemfontein